El Crack may refer to:

 El Crack (1960 film), a 1960 Argentine film
 El Crack (1981 film), a 1981 Spanish film